The 22nd European Film Awards were presented on 12 December 2009, in Bochum, Germany.

Winners and nominees

Best Actor
 Tahar Rahim – A Prophet (Un prophète)
Moritz Bleibtreu – The Baader Meinhof Complex (Der Baader Meinhof Komplex)
Steve Evets – Looking for Eric
David Kross – The Reader 
Dev Patel – Slumdog Millionaire
Filippo Timi – Vincere

Best Actress
 Kate Winslet – The Reader 
Penélope Cruz – Broken Embraces (Los abrazos rotos)
Charlotte Gainsbourg – Antichrist
Katie Jarvis – Fish Tank
Yolande Moreau – Séraphine
Noomi Rapace – The Girl with the Dragon Tattoo (Män som hatar kvinnor)

Best Animated Film
 Mia and the Migou (Mia et le Migou) – Jacques-Rémy Girerd
Niko & the Way to the Stars (Niko - Lentäjän poika) – Michael Hegner and Kari Juusonen
The Secret of Kells – Tomm Moore

Best Cinematographer
 Anthony Dod Mantle – Antichrist and Slumdog Millionaire
Christian Berger – The White Ribbon (Das weiße Band)
Maxim Drozdov and Alisher Khamidkhodzhaev – Paper Soldier (Bumazhny soldat)
Stéphane Fontaine – A Prophet (Un prophète)

Best Composer
 Alberto Iglesias – Broken Embraces (Los abrazos rotos)
Alexandre Desplat – Coco Before Chanel (Coco avant Chanel)
Jakob Groth – The Girl with the Dragon Tattoo (Män som hatar kvinnor)
Johan Söderqvist – Let the Right One In (Låt den rätte komma in)

Best Director
 Michael Haneke – The White Ribbon (Das weiße Band)
Pedro Almodóvar – Broken Embraces (Los abrazos rotos)
Andrea Arnold – Fish Tank
Jacques Audiard – A Prophet (Un prophète)
Danny Boyle – Slumdog Millionaire
Lars von Trier – Antichrist

Best Film

Best Screenwriter
 Michael Haneke – The White Ribbon (Das weiße Band)
Jacques Audiard and Thomas Bidegain – A Prophet (Un prophète)
Simon Beaufoy – Slumdog Millionaire
Gianni di Gregorio – Mid-August Lunch (Pranzo di ferragosto)

2009 film awards
European Film Awards ceremonies
Bochum
2009 in Europe